Amīn al-Dawla ("Trusted Supporter of the Dynasty/State") is an Arabic honorific title. It may refer to:

 al-Hasan ibn Ammar ( 962–997), Fatimid commander and chief minister
 Ibn al-Tilmīdh (1073–1165), Syriac Christian physician and scholar in the Abbasid court
 Farrokh Khan (1812–1871), Persian official and ambassador to Napoleon III and Queen Victoria

Arabic honorifics